Oldeholtpade is a village in Weststellingwerf in the province of Friesland, the Netherlands. It had a population of around 1,020 in 2017.

The village was first mentioned in 1204 as "Holenpathe juxta Liennam1", and means "old low-lying path". Olde (old) has been added to distinguish from Nijeholtpade. Oldeholtpade is a road village which developed along the Wolvega to Oosterwolde road. The Dutch Reformed church was built in 1545 to replace a church from 1204. The tower was built in 1608.

Oldeholtpade was home to 407 people in 1840.

Gallery

References

External links

Geography of Weststellingwerf
Populated places in Friesland